The Swedish Swimming Grand Prix series is a national swimming competition held each year in Sweden. The events take place in Long Course with morning finals as in the 2008 Summer Olympics. The meets are open for swimmers competing outside Sweden.

Events
The events are the same for all meets, but the competition programme may vary. All events are swum in prelims and finals except for 800 m and 1500 m Freestyle, which are swum in timed finals. The meets are held over three days, with prelims in the morning and finals in the evening. These are the events:
Freestyle: 50 m, 100 m, 200 m, 400 m, 800 m/1500 m (different from meet to meet).
Backstroke: 50 m, 100 m, 200 m
Breaststroke: 50 m, 100 m, 200 m
Butterfly: 50 m, 100 m, 200 m
Individual medley: 200 m, 400 m

See also
Swedish Swimming Championships
FINA Swimming World Cup
List of swimming competitions

Swimming competitions in Sweden